Niagara Falls City Hall is a historic city hall located at Niagara Falls in Niagara County, New York.  It was constructed in 1923–1924, in the Beaux-Arts style. The building embodies Neo-Classical Revival architectural details.  It features a centrally arranged rectangular form, with a central projecting pavilion, fluted columns with Ionic capitals, and smooth ashlar sandstone walls with pilasters.

It was listed on the National Register of Historic Places in 2001.

Gallery

References

External links

Niagara Falls City Hall - U.S. National Register of Historic Places on Waymarking.com

City and town halls on the National Register of Historic Places in New York (state)
Government buildings completed in 1924
Beaux-Arts architecture in New York (state)
Buildings and structures in Niagara Falls, New York
National Register of Historic Places in Niagara County, New York